is a former Japanese football player.

Playing career
Nemoto was born in Kashima on July 21, 1981. He joined J1 League club Kashima Antlers based in his local from youth team in 2000. Although he played several matches as left side back, he could not play many matches until 2001. In 2002, he moved to J2 League club Cerezo Osaka. He became a regular player as left side midfielder and played many matches and the club won the 2nd place and was promoted to J1 from 2003. In 2003, he moved to J1 club Vegalta Sendai. He played many matches as regular left side back and was selected Fair Play award. However the club was relegated to J2 from 2004. In 2004, he moved to J1 club Oita Trinita. Although he was not regular player until 2005, he became a regular player as left side midfielder in summer 2005. In 2006, he played in all 34 matches and was selected Fair Play award second time. However his opportunity to play decreased behind new member Shingo Suzuki from summer 2007. In June 2008, he moved to J1 club JEF United Chiba. However he could not play many matches. In 2009, he moved to Regional Leagues club Zweigen Kanazawa. He played in all matches in 2009 and the club was promoted to Japan Football League from 2010. he played many matches as regular player until 2012 and retired end of 2012 season.

Club statistics

References

External links

1981 births
Living people
Association football people from Ibaraki Prefecture
Japanese footballers
J1 League players
J2 League players
Japan Football League players
Kashima Antlers players
Cerezo Osaka players
Vegalta Sendai players
Oita Trinita players
JEF United Chiba players
Zweigen Kanazawa players
Asian Games medalists in football
Footballers at the 2002 Asian Games
Asian Games silver medalists for Japan
Association football defenders
Medalists at the 2002 Asian Games